Parks is an extinct town in Butler County, in the U.S. state of Missouri. The GNIS classifies it as a populated place.

A post office called Park was established in 1911, and closed in 1915. The community was named after John and Barnes Park, businessmen in the local lumber industry.

References

Ghost towns in Missouri
Former populated places in Butler County, Missouri